Jeta is an Indian Marathi language film directed by Yogesh Sahebrao Mahajan and produced by Sanjay Laxmanrao Yadav under the banner of Sanju Entertainment. The film stars Snehal Deshmukh and Nitish Chavan. It also stars Sharad Goyekar, Aniket Kelkar, Pragya Sonawane-Davre in pivotal roles.

Synopsis 
It depicts the journey of a stubborn young man who falls in love with a woman from a rich family. It presents some neglected aspects of friendship that have never been explored before. The film shows the reality while presenting the bitter truth of life.

Cast 
 Snehal Deshmukh
 Nitish Chavan
 Sharad Goyekar
 Mugdha Chaphekar
 Pragya Sonawane

References

External links

2020s Marathi-language films
Indian drama films
Indian romance films
Indian comedy films